Lisette Pollet (born 4 January 1968) is a French politician who has represented the 2nd constituency of the Drôme department in the National Assembly since 2022. A member of the National Rally (RN), she has also been a regional councillor of Auvergne-Rhône-Alpes since 2021.

References 

1968 births
Living people
National Rally (France) politicians
Deputies of the 16th National Assembly of the French Fifth Republic
Women members of the National Assembly (France)
21st-century French women politicians
People from Loir-et-Cher
Politicians from Auvergne-Rhône-Alpes
Regional councillors of Auvergne-Rhône-Alpes